The Spring Standards is an independent three-piece folk-rock band based in New York City.

Biography
 James Cleare, Heather Robb and James Smith first sang together in the last summer of the 20th century. Having just turned 16, the three teens with a common affinity for "oldies" music and harmony spent the better part of the next two years playing shows around the Delaware/Pennsylvania area. Influenced as much by their parent's record collections as they were by what they heard on the radio, their style began to take shape into something a little bit both and a little bit neither. When high school graduation came along, their paths divided; years passed and things changed, but before they knew it they were all living within a few blocks of each other in New York City. The transition back into making music together was as natural as it was surprising - they happily picked up where they had left off years before, with a unique style that refuses to sit comfortably in any genre.

Cleare, Robb, and Smith are all songwriters and multi-instrumentalists. They use their strengths as a trio to create a sound that listeners might expect from a band twice their size. With an emphasis on 3-part harmony and a variety of instrumental switching, their range, and energy onstage make each live show a unique event.

Before they were The Spring Standards, all three members were in Old Springs Pike along with John Gallagher Jr. The three current members also played together in an earlier band called The Urban Wombats.

Members
The band members are:
 James Cleare - vocals, acoustic, bass, and electric guitars, harmonica, drums, and percussion
 Heather Robb - vocals, melodica, keyboard, glockenspiel, drums, accordion, and percussion
 James Smith - vocals, acoustic, bass and electric guitars, trumpet, drums, and percussion

Recording
The Spring Standards released their first EP No One Will Know in July 2008 which was co-produced by Rhett Miller of Old 97s and engineered by Kieran Kelly of The Buddy Project. The self-released EP found mild success in the North East leading to an appearance on Late Night with Conan O'Brien. On April 13, 2010, they self-released their first full-length album Would Things Be Different produced by Bryce Goggin (Pavement, Phish, The Apples in Stereo).

The Spring Standards returned to the studio in early 2011 to record a double EP entitled yellow//gold, released on May 1st, 2012. The record was produced by Dan Molad.

On December 26th, 2012, The Spring Standards recorded audio and video at their fifth annual Boxing Day concert at the Arden Club Gild Hall, Arden, Delaware. The project was funded by a Kickstarter campaign. The album Live from Delaware was released on May 21, 2013.

Discography
No One Will Know EP (Released July 29, 2008)
 1. Goodbye Midnight
 2. In The Underground
 3. Little Bug
 4. Reply
 5. Breath And Sound
 6. Your Lie
 7. Sad Song
 8. Pin Cushion (Bonus Track)

Would Things be Different (Released April 13, 2010)
 1. Skyline
 2. Here I Am
 3. Queen Of The Lot
 4. Halcyon Days
 5. Bells And Whistles
 6. Not Again
 7. Frozen
 8. Trouble
 9. Sharks
 10. The Hush
 11. Unravel Unwind
 12. Drowning In Sobriety (Bonus Track)

yellow/gold Double EP (Released May 1, 2012)
 1. Only Skin
 2. Heavy Home
 3. Chicago
 4. Crushing Pennies
 5. Enemies
 6. Wildfire Forest
 7. So Simple So True
 8. Nightmare
 9. Watch The Moon Disappear
 10. Rusty Wheels
 11. Here We Go
 12. Unmarked Pill

Live from Delaware (Released May 21, 2013)
 1. Wildfire Forest
 2. Queen of the Lot
 3. Nightmare
 4. Rusty Wheels
 5. The Hush
 6. Only Skin
 7. Bells and Whistles
 8. Chicago
 9. Sharks
 10. Premonition
 11. Here We Go
 12. Unravel Unwind
 13. Watch the Moon Disappear
 14. Reply (Offstage)
 15. Frozen (Offstage)
 16. Crushing Pennies (Offstage)

Touring
The Spring Standards have toured nationwide at major venues and have been featured on Conan O'Brien (August 2008), Pepsi's Poptub, USA's "Royal Pains" and MTV's Exiled. The band performed on The Rock Boat IX in 2009, "the floating music festival at sea".

The Spring Standards have become somewhat of a staple on New York's Rock Station 101.9 WRXP, having been invited to play "The Rock Show with Matt Pinfield and Leslie Fram" on numerous occasions, including an annual appearance to sing The Pogues' holiday classic Fairytale of New York with Pinfield on air.

The band has toured nationwide at major venues.  They have performed as an opening act for musicians including Old 97s, The Clarks, Works Progress Administration (musical group), Stephen Kellogg and the Sixers, Caravan of Thieves (band), Rustic Overtones, Rigby Fawkes, Squeeze (band), The Everybodyfields, and Glenn Tilbrook and the Fluffers.

In 2010, The Spring Standards were selected to perform at the famed Austin music festival South by Southwest.
They also embarked with Joey Ryan on "The Gang Goes On Tour 2010", headlined by Meg & Dia.

The band was on tour with Ha Ha Tonka throughout the Spring of 2011.

In 2012, The Spring Standards returned to South by Southwest for several showings. In preparation for their new album, they went on the road for a CD release tour in May to promote their new music. Joined by Rhett Miller & The Serial Lady Killers, The Spring Standards kicked off a US tour shortly after in June. On June 18, they appeared on Conan O'Brien's talk show, Conan, and performed "Here We Go".

In February 2013, the band embarked on a six-week tour of the northeast U.S., playing in cities such as Boston, Massachusetts, Philadelphia, Pennsylvania, and Washington, DC. May 21 saw the release of their first live album, Live from Delaware (with a DVD release in 2014). That same week, they made an appearance at the Watkins Family Hour, along with singer/songwriter Dan Wilson.

In 2014 they returned to South by Southwest.

The band has also worked with New York composers Kerrigan-Lowdermilk, appearing in concerts and on recordings.

References

External links

 
 

American folk rock groups
Rock music groups from New York (state)